The Constitutional Court of Gabon (Cour Constitutionnelle de la république gabonaise or Cour constitutionnelle du Gabon) is the constitutional court of Gabon. It has nine members and was established by the National Assembly in July 1991. The current president is Marie-Madeleine Mborantsuo, in the office since its creation.

References

External links

Photographs of the building on Tripadvisor website

Courts in Africa